Chroślice  is a village in the administrative district of Gmina Męcinka, within Jawor County, Lower Silesian Voivodeship, in south-western Poland. Prior to 1945, it was a part of Germany.

The village has a population of 145.

References

Villages in Jawor County